Petite or  petite may refer to:

Petit (crater), a small, bowl-shaped lunar crater on Mare Spumans
Petit (EP), a 1995 EP by Japanese singer-songwriter Ua
Petit (typography), another name for brevier-size type
Petit four
Petit Gâteau
Petit Jean State Park, Arkansas, United States
Petit juror
Petite bourgeoisie in sociology
petite mutation, a mutation in yeast oxidative phosphorylation
Petite sizes in women's clothing
Petit's triangle (inferior lumbar triangle), see Petit's hernia

People
A French or Catalan surname:
Adriana Petit (born 1984), Spanish multidisciplinary artist
Alexis Thérèse Petit (1791–1820), French physicist
Amandine Petit (born 1997), French model, beauty pageant titleholder, and Miss France 2021
Antoine Petit (1722–1794), French physician
Antoni Martí Petit, prime minister of Andorra 
François Pourfour du Petit (1664–1741), French anatomist
Henriette Petit (1894-1983), Chilean painter
Jean-Martin Petit (1772–1856), French General during the Napoleonic Wars
Monique Ruck-Petit (born 1942), Swiss and French chess master
Paul Petit (aviator) (1890-1918), French flying ace
Philippe Petit (born 1949), French high-wire artist
Pierre Petit (photographer) (1832–1909), French photographer
Pierre Petit (scholar) (1617–1687), French scholar, medical writer, and poet
Pierre Petit (engineer), (1598–1677), French military engineer, mathematician, and physicist
Pierre Petit (cinematographer) (1920–1997), French cinematographer
Pierre Petit (composer) (1922–2000), French composer
Pierre Petit (politician) (born 1930), Martinique politician 
Pierre Petit (driver), (born 1957), French racecar driver
Roland Petit (1924–2011), French choreographer and dancer
The surname for a prominent Parsi family of India, whose members include:
Dinshaw Maneckji Petit, (1823–1901), Indian industrialist
His granddaughter Rattanbai Petit (1900–1929), wife of Jinnah, founder of Pakistan
The Petit Family, 2007 Connecticut home invasion and murder victims 
John F. Petit (1887–1963), American businessman and politician
John Louis Petit (1801–1868), English clergyman and architectural artist
Loretta Petit, American radio personality
Yusmeiro Petit (born 1984), Venezuelan baseballer

Stagename:
Petite (comedian), Filipino actor and comedian

Footballers
Emmanuel Petit (born 1970), former French midfielder, who played for France, Monaco, Arsenal, Barcelona and Chelsea
Petit (Portuguese footballer) (born 1976), Portuguese midfielder
Jean Petit (Belgian footballer) (born 1914), Belgian defender
Jean Petit (footballer, born 1949) (born 1949), former French football midfielder
Paulinho Le Petit (born 1989), Brazilian footballer
Petit Sory (born 1945), former Guinean football player
René Petit (1899–1989), Franco-Spanish engineer and a footballer in his youth

See also
 Sauveur Abel Aubert Petit de la Saussaye (1792–1870), French malacologist
Pettit (disambiguation)
Pettitt (surname)

French-language surnames